Mino Maccari (24 November 1898 – 16 June 1989) was an Italian painter. His work was part of the painting event in the art competition at the 1948 Summer Olympics. Maccari was one of the founders of a political magazine, Il Selvaggio, which was launched in 1924.

References

1898 births
1989 deaths
20th-century Italian painters
Italian male painters
Olympic competitors in art competitions
People from Siena
Italian magazine founders
20th-century Italian male artists